Pallavi Kulkarni (born 15 June 1982) is an Indian television actress.

Filmography

Television

Films
Arjun Pandit as Shilpa (1999)
Kranti as Anu (2002)
Munna Michael as cameo appearance (2017)

References

External links

Indian television actresses
Actresses in Hindi television
1982 births
Living people
Actresses in Hindi cinema
Indian film actresses
21st-century Indian actresses